The 1900 British Columbia general election was held in 1900. It was held to elect members of the Legislative Assembly of British Columbia. The election was called on April 24, 1900, and held on June 9, 1900.  The new legislature met for the first time on July 19, 1900.

Like in the previous BC general election, of the 38 MLAs 24 were elected in single member districts in 1900. There were also three 2-member districts and two 4-member districts. Each voter could cast as many votes as there were seats to fill in the district.

This was the last election in which political parties were not part of the official process in British Columbia, although because of the political chaos in this year resulting from the joint misrule of Premier Joseph Martin and the Lieutenant-Governor, Thomas Robert McInnes, many individual candidates declared their party affiliations in many ridings as a protest against the non-party system.

For more on the political circumstances of this election, please see 1898 British Columbia general election.

Results by riding 

|-
||    
|align="center"|Edwin Clarke Smith
|align="center"  |East Kootenay (south riding)Government
||    
||    
|align="center"  rowspan=2|CassiarConservative OppositionIndependent Opposition
|align="center"|Charles William Digby Clifford
||    
|-
||    
|align="center"|John Oliver
|align="center"  |Westminster-DeltaGovernment
||    
||    
|align="center"|James Stables
||    
|-
||    
|align="center"|John Cunningham Brown
|align="center"  |New Westminster CityGovernment||    
||    
|align="center"  |AlberniProgressive|align="center"|Alan Webster Neill
||    
|-
||    
|align="center"|Hugh Bowie Gilmour
|align="center" rowspan=2 |Vancouver CityGovernment||    
||    
|align="center"  rowspan=2|CaribooOpposition|align="center"|Joseph Hunter
||    
|-
||    
|align="center"|Joseph Martin1
||    
||    
|align="center"|Samuel Augustus Rogers 
||    
|-
||    
|align="center"|Smith Curtis
|align="center"  |West Kootenay-RosslandGovernment||    
||    
|align="center"  |ComoxOpposition|align="center"|Lewis Alfred Mounce
||    
|-
|
|
|
|
||    
|align="center" rowspan=2 |EsquimaltIndependent OppositionOpposition|align="center"|William Henry Hayward 
||    
|-
|
|
|
|
||    
|align="center"|Charles Edward Pooley
||    
|-
|
|
|
|
||    
|align="center"  |CowichanIndependent Conservative|align="center"|Charles Herbert Dickie
||    
|-
|
|
|
|
||    
|align="center"  |Lillooet EastOpposition Progressive|align="center"|James Douglas Prentice
||    
|-
|
|
|
|
||    
|align="center"  |East Kootenay (north riding)Independent Progressive|align="center"|Wilmer Cleveland Wells
||    
|-
|
|
|
|
||    
|align="center"  |Nanaimo CityLabour|align="center"|Ralph Smith
||    
|-
|
|
|
|
||    
|align="center"  |South NanaimoOpposition|align="center"|James Dunsmuir2
||    
|-
|
|
|
|
||    
|align="center"  |Lillooet WestIndependent Opposition|align="center"|Alfred Wellington Smith
||    
|-
|
|
|
|
||    
|align="center" rowspan=2 |Vancouver CityConservative|align="center"|James Ford Garden
||    
|-
|
|
|
|
||    
|align="center"|Robert Garnett Tatlow
||    
|-
|
|
|
|
||    
|align="center"  |North NanaimoIndependent|align="center"|William Wallace Burns McInnes
||    
|-
|
|
|
|
||    
|align="center"  |North VictoriaIndependent Liberal|align="center"|John Paton Booth
||    
|-
|
|
|
|
||    
|align="center"  |South VictoriaOpposition
|align="center"|David McEwen Eberts
||    
|-
|
|
|
|
||    
|align="center"  |West Kootenay-NelsonOpposition
|align="center"|John Frederick Hume
||    
|-
|
|
|
|
||    
|align="center" rowspan=4 |Victoria CityOpposition
|align="center"|Richard Hall
||    
|-
|
|
|
|
||    
|align="center"|Henry Dallas Helmcken
||    
|-
|
|
|
|
||    
|align="center"|Albert Edward McPhillips
||    
|-
|
|
|
|
||    
|align="center"|John Herbert Turner
||    
|-
|
|
|
|
||    
|align="center"  |West Kootenay-RevelstokeConservative
|align="center"|Thomas Taylor
||    
|-
|
|
|
|
||    
|align="center"  |West Kootenay-SlocanProgressive
|align="center"|Robert Francis Green
||    
|-
|
|
|
|
||    
|align="center"  |Westminster-ChilliwhackProgressive
|align="center"|Charles William Munro
||    
|-
|
|
|
|
||    
|align="center"  |Westminster-DewdneyConservative
|align="center"|Richard McBride
||    
|-
|
|
|
|
||    
|align="center"  |Westminster-RichmondConservative
|align="center"|Thomas Kidd
||    
|-
|
|
|
|
||    
|align="center"  |Yale-EastOpposition
|align="center"|Price Ellison
||    
|-
|
|
|
|
||    
|align="center"  |Yale-NorthIndependent Opposition
|align="center"|Frederick John Fulton
||    
|-
|
|
|
|
||    
|align="center"  |Yale-WestOpposition Progressive
|align="center"|Denis Murphy
||    
|-
|
|align-left"|1 Incumbent Premier
|
|
|
|
|align-left"|2 Premier-Elect
|-
| align="center" colspan="10"|Source: Elections BC
|-
|}

See also
List of British Columbia political parties

Further reading & references

In the Sea of Sterile Mountains: The Chinese in British Columbia, Joseph Morton, J.J. Douglas, Vancouver (1974).  Despite its title, a fairly thorough account of the politicians and electoral politics in early BC.

References

1900
1900 elections in Canada
1900 in British Columbia
June 1900 events